Alejandro Lamalfa (1946/1947 – 18 August 2021) was a Spanish politician who served as a Senator.

References

1940s births
2021 deaths
Spanish politicians
Members of the 6th Senate of Spain
People from the Province of Palencia